The 349th Air Refueling Squadron is a unit of the US Air Force, part of the 22d Air Refueling Wing at McConnell Air Force Base, Kansas.  It operates the Boeing KC-135 Stratotanker aircraft conducting aerial refueling missions.

History

World War II
Constituted 349 Bombardment Squadron (Heavy) on 28 January 1942. Activated on 1 June 1942 at Orlando AB, FL as a Boeing B-17 Flying Fortress heavy bombardment squadron in mid-1942; trained initially under Third Air Force in the southeast, then transferring to Second Air Force in the Pacific Northwest.  Operated as an Operational Training Unit in the Midwest until being deployed to the European Theater of Operations, being assigned to VIII Bomber Command in England in June 1943. Redesignated 349 Bombardment Squadron, Heavy, on 20 August 1943.

Engaged in strategic bombardment operations over Occupied Europe and Germany, sustaining very heavy losses of personnel and aircraft while conducting many unescorted missions over enemy territory attacking airfields, industries, naval facilities and transportation hubs.   During the summer of 1944, aircrews bombed enemy positions at Saint-Lô, followed by similar campaigns at Brest in August and September. In October 1944, the squadron attacked enemy and ground defenses in the allied drive on the Siegfried Line, then bombed marshaling yards, German occupied villages, and communication targets in the Ardennes during the Battle of the Bulge from December 1944 to January 1945.  Attacked enemy targets in Germany during the spring of 1945, ending combat operations with the German capitulation in May 1945.

Remained in Europe as part of the United States Air Forces in Europe occupation forces, dropping food to the people in the west of the Netherlands, and in June transported French Allied former prisoners of war from Austria to France. Demobilizing in England, in December 1945 the squadron inactivated as a paper unit.

Air Force reserve
Activated in the reserves in 1947 at Miami Army Air Field, Florida.  Unclear whether or not the unit was manned or equipped; inactivated in 1949 due to budget restrictions.

Strategic Air Command
Reactivated under Strategic Air Command received new, swept wing Boeing B-47 Stratojets in 1956 which were designed to carry nuclear weapons and to penetrate Soviet air defenses with its high operational ceiling and near supersonic speed. The squadron flew the B-47 for about a decade when by the mid-1960s it had become obsolescent and vulnerable to new Soviet air defenses.    The squadron began to send its Stratojets to Aerospace Maintenance and Regeneration Center at Davis–Monthan AFB for retirement in 1965, the last being retired in 1966, one of the last B-47 Squadrons.

Redesignated as a strategic reconnaissance squadron from 1966–1976.

Air Refueling
The squadron flew air refueling in support of the Lockheed SR-71 Blackbird from 1976–1990 and provided cargo and aerial refueling support to combat units in Southwest Asia from, August 1990 – March 1991.

Lineage
 Constituted as the 349th Bombardment Squadron (Heavy) on 28 January 1942
 Activated on 1 June 1942
 Redesignated 349th Bombardment Squadron, Heavy on 20 August 1943
 Inactivated on 1 December 1945
 Redesignated 349th Bombardment Squadron, Very Heavy on 13 May 1947
 Activated in the reserve on 29 May 1947
 Inactivated on 27 June 1949
 Redesignated 349th Bombardment Squadron, Medium on 1 August 1955
 Activated on 1 January 1956
 Redesignated 349th Strategic Reconnaissance Squadron on 25 June 1966
 Redesignated 349th Air Refueling Squadron, Heavy on 30 September 1976
 Redesignated 349th Air Refueling Squadron on 1 September 1991
 Inactivated on 1 June 1992
 Activated on 1 January 1994

Assignments
 100th Bombardment Group, 1 June 1942 – 1 December 1945
 100th Bombardment Group, 29 May 1947 – 27 June 1949
 100th Bombardment Wing (later 100th Strategic Reconnaissance Wing, 100th Air Refueling Wing), 1 January 1956
 9th Strategic Reconnaissance Wing, 15 March 1983
 9th Operations Group, 1 September 1991 – 1 June 1992
 22d Operations Group, 1 January 1994 – present

Stations

 Orlando Army Air Base, Florida 1 June 1942
 Barksdale Field, Louisiana, c. 18 June 1942
 Pendleton Field, Oregon c. 26 June 1942
 Gowen Field, Idaho, 28 August 1942
 Walla Walla Army Air Field, Washington, c. 1 November 1942
 Wendover Field, Utah, c. 30 November 1942
 Sioux City Army Air Base, Iowa, c. 28 December 1942
 Kearney Army Air Field, Nebraska, c. 30 January – May 1943
 RAF Thorpe Abbotts (AAF Station 139), England, 9 June 1943 – December 1945
 Camp Kilmer, New Jersey, c. 20–21 December 1945

 Miami Army Air Field (later Miami International Airport), Florida (1947–1949)
 Portsmouth Air Force Base (later Pease Air Force Base), New Hampshire, 1 January 1956 – 30 April 1966 (deployed to RAF Brize Norton, England 4 January–1 April 1958)
 Davis–Monthan Air Force Base, Arizona, 25 June 1966 – 1 July 1976
 Beale Air Force Base, California, 25 January 1982
 McConnell Air Force Base, Kansas, 1 January 1994 – present)

Aircraft

 Boeing B-17 Flying Fortress (1942–1945)
 North American AT-6 Texan (1947–1949)
 Beechcraft AT-7 Navigator (1947–1949)
 Beechcraft AT-11 Kansan (1947–1949)
 Boeing B-47 Stratojet (1956–1966)
 Lockheed U-2 (1966–1976)
 Lockheed WU-2 (1966–1976)
 Boeing KC-135 Stratotanker (1976–1992, 1994 – present)

References

 Notes

Bibliography

 
 
 
 
 

Military units and formations in Kansas
Air refueling squadrons of the United States Air Force
Units and formations of Strategic Air Command
1942 establishments in Florida